"In This Life" is a song by Australian pop singer Delta Goodrem. It was released as the first single from her third album Delta. The song was written by Goodrem, Brian McFadden, Stuart Crichton and Tommy Lee James. The producer of the song is John Shanks (Hilary Duff, Take That, Bon Jovi, Ashlee Simpson). According to an article in the Herald Sun, the song is "a more guitar-driven vibe and updates Goodrem's sound."

The song was released on Australian radio on 28 August 2007 and had a physical release through CD and digital download on 17 September 2007. It was also released as the first single in the United States on 15 April 2008.

Background
According to Goodrem, she wrote the song just after Christmas. Stuart Crichton co-wrote the song and wanted the singer to use her well-known letter ending "Love & Light" in a song. In the start of the chorus, Goodrem sings: 
You give me love,
You give me light
Goodrem told The Daily Telegraph that she needed to deal with personal demons and feelings first to be able to write a song like "In This Life". According to her biography on her official site, the song "reaffirms new beginnings, celebrates perseverance, and rejoices in moving forward." Goodrem also stated that "In This Life" was a great introduction for her new album. During a chat session on her official forum, Goodrem said the song was about "the journey you go on in this life and accepting what life throws at you and growing from the experience and concentrating on the positives in life."

The song was also used as the third opening theme music to the Japanese anime series Deltora Quest, which ran from 2007 to 2008.

Reviews
The song received positive reviews which praises Goodrem's new sound and look. News.com.au commented: "'In This Life' is undoubtedly a Delta Goodrem song, it unveils a more sexy and mature sound for the artist who dominated the Australian airwaves after the release of her debut single, 'Born to Try'." The Herald Sun said "'In This Life' has a more guitar-driven vibe and updates Goodrem's sound."

Billboard magazine gave the song a positive review, introducing Goodrem in the United States. Reviewer Chuck Taylor said about the song: "In This Life" is an ideal vehicle to fuel horsepower, showcasing frantic piano, turbine tempo, a singalong lyric about giving into love ... and a vocal that illustrates incomparable prowess."

Music video
The video for the song was shot in Los Angeles on 10 August 2007, directed by Rocky Schenck. According to insiders, the video is the sexiest Goodrem has made to date, with Goodrem having a Brigitte Bardot look in several scenes. Goodrem herself said about making the video; "It took me a second to get back into gear because I haven't made a video for so long, but it felt better than ever."

The video premiered on 31 August 2007 on the TV program Sunrise. Although the video has been criticised for being too "basic", it has been praised for its effectiveness by intentionally having a simple video with the focus placed upon Goodrem's personality thus creating a fresh and bright mood rather than a story and having special effects. Goodrem had also stated that she had wanted it to be about her singing the song.

In late March, Goodrem returned from California, where she filmed a new clip for the US version of "In This Life". The video clip, in which she stretches seductively on a stretch of sand on Malibu Beach, will be used to introduce her to the US audiences, as well as a photoshoot for the new cover of her self-titled album, Delta, which was released in the US in July. For the new video she worked with director Robert Hales (who has also shot videos for Justin Timberlake and Gnarls Barkley) who choose to give a good introduction of Goodrem: her basics as an artist. Goodrem says about the video: "It's quite earthy and creative. It's going to be an introduction for me. I have to be at the piano. I have to introduce myself and say 'Here I am, this new artist'." The video premiered on Universal Music Group's YouTube channel on 15 May 2008. Throughout the video different leaves are created around her that can be compared with the way Goodrem's Mistaken Identity album cover was designed.

Chart performance
According to the Australian Today show, "In This Life" was the  1 most added song on radio after it was released to radio. It also debuted at No. 6 on the national airplay charts The week after it moved to No. 2. The song later hit No. 1, pushing Matchbox Twenty to No. 4. The debut at No. 6 currently gives Goodrem the highest debut on the airplay chart ever.

In Australia, the song debuted at No. 1, making it her eighth No. 1 single. She is now only behind Kylie Minogue and Madonna with the most No. 1 singles by a female artist. The song debuted at No. 1 on the Physical Sales Chart and the Australian chart, and it also debuted at No. 3 on the Digital Track Chart and peaked at No. 2. In France, the song appeared on the official airplay chart at No. 85. The song also peaked at No. 1 on the Australian iTunes Store Top 100, pushing Britney Spears' "Gimme More" to No. 2. In New Zealand, the song became the 10th most added song during the Christmas week and peaked No. 8 on the radio airplay charts. "In This Life" was certified Gold, with 35,000 copies shipped in its first week. In its thirteenth week, it was certified Platinum. The song replaced "Beautiful Girls" by Sean Kingston but was replaced itself by the song the following week. In Asia, it debuted at No. 9 on the MTV Asia Hitlist and peaked at No. 2. On Japan's download charts, it peaked at the No. 1 position.

"In This Life" was released to US radio on 9 April. It was first released to the Triple A radio format, and then to the Adult Contemporary and Hot Adult Contemporary formats. No information is currently known as to when it will be released the Pop and Contemporary Hits formats.

On 17 June 2008, Goodrem appeared for the second time on any Billboard chart with the single, debuting at No. 40 on the Hot Adult Top 40 Tracks chart. The song later peaked at No. 21. According to Nielsen SoundScan, the track sold 7,000 digital downloads in the week ending on 24 June 2008.

"In This Life" has been used in Qantas Frequent Flyer advertisements, and was thought to have helped the song re-enter the Australian Singles chart on 14 July 2008 at No. 68, a remarkable jump of 41 places from the previous week.

Track listing

Australian CD single 1
 "In This Life"
 "Take Me Home"
:Comes with bonus sticker

Australian CD single 2
 "In This Life"
 "In This Life" (acoustic version)
:Comes with bonus poster

Australian iTunes exclusive
 "In This Life"
 "Breathe In, Breathe Out"

Japanese CD single
 "In This Life"
 "Take Me Home"
 "In This Life" (acoustic version)

US digital single
 "In This Life" (updated mix)

Charts

Weekly charts

Year-end charts

Certifications

Release history

References

2007 singles
Delta Goodrem songs
Music videos directed by Robert Hales
Music videos directed by Rocky Schenck
Number-one singles in Australia
Song recordings produced by John Shanks
Songs written by Delta Goodrem
Songs written by Tommy Lee James
Songs written by Brian McFadden
Songs written by Stuart Crichton
2007 songs